Ellos nos hicieron así is a 1952 Argentine film directed by Mario Soffici.

Cast

 Olga Zubarry		 
 Tito Alonso		 
 Alberto de Mendoza		 
 Alberto Dalbés		 
 Mirtha Torres		 
 Golde Flami		 
 Domingo Sapelli		 
 Benito Cibrián		 
 Casimiro Krukowski		 
 Luis Medina Castro		 
 Dora Vernet		 
 Nina Brian		 
 Saul Jarlip		 
 Elena Cruz		 
 Vicente Thomas		 
 María Esther Buschiazzo		 
 Paride Grandi		 
 Mónica Linares		 
 Carlos Cotto		 
 José De Angelis		 
 María Pérez		 
 Tito Grassi		 
 Pura Díaz		 
 Carmen Giménez		 
 Francisco Audenino		 
 Rafael Diserio		 
 Warly Ceriani		 
 Alberto Rudoy		 
 Luis Otero

References

External links

1952 films
1950s Spanish-language films
Argentine black-and-white films
Films directed by Mario Soffici
Argentine drama films
1952 drama films
1950s Argentine films